Michal Niewinski (born 12 July 2003) is a Polish short track speed skater. He competed at the 2022 Winter Olympics, in Men's 1500 metres, and Mixed 2000 metre relay.

References 

2003 births
Polish male short track speed skaters
Living people
Olympic short track speed skaters of Poland
Short track speed skaters at the 2022 Winter Olympics